Nathalie Tauziat was the defending champion, but lost in the semifinals to Brenda Schultz.

Katerina Maleeva won the title, defeating Schultz 6–3, 6–3 in the final.

Seeds

Draw

Finals

Top half

Bottom half

References
Main Draw and Qualifying Draw

Challenge Bell
Tournoi de Québec
Can